A by-election was held for the New South Wales Legislative Assembly electorate of Bulli on 3 June 1933 because of the death of Andrew Lysaght, .

Dates

Result

Andrew Lysaght, .

See also
Electoral results for the district of Bulli
List of New South Wales state by-elections

References

New South Wales state by-elections
1933 elections in Australia
1930s in New South Wales